SC Olkom Melitopol was a Ukrainian football club based in Melitopol.
The club withdrew from the PFL during the winter break of the 2010–11 season.

The club was founded in 1991. They played in the Second League. The team was originally named Torpedo, but was renamed to its current name in 2000. They played their home games at the Oleh Oleksenko Spartak Stadium in Melitopol. Beside its football team the club also had a boxing section.

League and cup history

Torpedo Melitopol (1991–1999)

{|class="wikitable"
|-bgcolor="#efefef"
! Season
! Div.
! Pos.
! Pl.
! W
! D
! L
! GS
! GA
! P
!Domestic Cup
!colspan=2|Europe
!Notes
|-
|align=center|1992–93
|align=center|4th
|align=center|11
|align=center|34
|align=center|12
|align=center|6
|align=center|16
|align=center|39
|align=center|41
|align=center|30
|align=center|
|align=center|
|align=center|
|align=center|
|-
|align=center|1993–94
|align=center|4th
|align=center|8
|align=center|34
|align=center|12
|align=center|12
|align=center|10
|align=center|35
|align=center|34
|align=center|36
|align=center|
|align=center|
|align=center|
|align=center|
|-
|align=center|1994–95
|align=center|4th
|align=center|4
|align=center|42
|align=center|24
|align=center|11
|align=center|7
|align=center|51
|align=center|31
|align=center|83
|align=center|1/64 finals
|align=center|
|align=center|
|align=center bgcolor=Green|Promoted
|-
|align=center|1995–96
|align=center|3rd "B"
|align=center|13
|align=center|38
|align=center|12
|align=center|14
|align=center|12
|align=center|44
|align=center|35
|align=center|50
|align=center|1/64 finals
|align=center|
|align=center|
|align=center|
|-
|align=center|1996–97
|align=center|3rd "B"
|align=center|10
|align=center|32
|align=center|9
|align=center|14
|align=center|9
|align=center|26
|align=center|32
|align=center|41
|align=center|1/128 finals
|align=center|
|align=center|
|align=center|
|-
|align=center|1997–98
|align=center|3rd "B"
|align=center|8
|align=center|32
|align=center|7
|align=center|12
|align=center|13
|align=center|38
|align=center|43
|align=center|33
|align=center|1/64 finals
|align=center|
|align=center|
|align=center|
|-
|align=center|1998–99
|align=center|3rd "B"
|align=center|7
|align=center|26
|align=center|10
|align=center|7
|align=center|9
|align=center|27
|align=center|35
|align=center|37
|align=center|Did not enter
|align=center|
|align=center|
|align=center|
|}

OLKOM Melitopol (2000– )
{|class="wikitable"
|-bgcolor="#efefef"
! Season
! Div.
! Pos.
! Pl.
! W
! D
! L
! GS
! GA
! P
!Domestic Cup
!colspan=2|Europe
!Notes
|-
|align=center|1999–00
|align=center|3rd "B"
|align=center|8
|align=center|26
|align=center|10
|align=center|4
|align=center|12
|align=center|26
|align=center|30
|align=center|34
|align=center|1/8 finals Second League Cup
|align=center|
|align=center|
|align=center|
|-
|align=center|2000–01
|align=center|3rd "B"
|align=center|12
|align=center|28
|align=center|6
|align=center|7
|align=center|15
|align=center|18
|align=center|48
|align=center|25
|align=center|1/32 finals Second League Cup
|align=center|
|align=center|
|align=center|
|-
|align=center|2001–02
|align=center|3rd "B"
|align=center|4
|align=center|34
|align=center|19
|align=center|3
|align=center|12
|align=center|56
|align=center|35
|align=center|60
|align=center|1st round
|align=center|
|align=center|
|align=center|
|-
|align=center|2002–03
|align=center|3rd "B"
|align=center|4
|align=center|30
|align=center|18
|align=center|5
|align=center|7
|align=center|45
|align=center|27
|align=center|59
|align=center|1/16 finals
|align=center|
|align=center|
|align=center|
|-
|align=center|2003–04
|align=center|3rd "B"
|align=center|5
|align=center|30
|align=center|13
|align=center|6
|align=center|11
|align=center|39
|align=center|44
|align=center|45
|align=center|1/32 finals
|align=center|
|align=center|
|align=center|
|-
|align=center|2004–05
|align=center|3rd "B"
|align=center|8
|align=center|26
|align=center|9
|align=center|7
|align=center|10
|align=center|27
|align=center|33
|align=center|34
|align=center|1/32 finals
|align=center|
|align=center|
|align=center|
|-
|align=center|2005–06
|align=center|3rd "B"
|align=center|14
|align=center|28
|align=center|6
|align=center|7
|align=center|15
|align=center|25
|align=center|39
|align=center|25
|align=center|1/32 finals
|align=center|
|align=center|
|align=center|
|-
|align=center|2006–07
|align=center|3rd "B"
|align=center|7
|align=center|28
|align=center|10
|align=center|8
|align=center|10
|align=center|35
|align=center|29
|align=center|38
|align=center|1/16 finals
|align=center|
|align=center|
|align=center|
|-
|align=center|2007–08
|align=center|3rd "B"
|align=center|9
|align=center|34
|align=center|14
|align=center|7
|align=center|13
|align=center|38
|align=center|34
|align=center|49
|align=center|1/32 finals
|align=center|
|align=center|
|align=center|
|-
|align=center|2008–09
|align=center|3rd "B"
|align=center|7
|align=center|34
|align=center|14
|align=center|8
|align=center|12
|align=center|40
|align=center|43
|align=center|50
|align=center|1/16 finals
|align=center|
|align=center|
|align=center|
|-
|align=center|2009–10
|align=center|3rd "B"
|align=center|10
|align=center|26
|align=center|7
|align=center|5
|align=center|14
|align=center|31
|align=center|42
|align=center|26
|align=center|1/64 finals
|align=center|
|align=center|
|align=center|
|-
|align=center|2010–11
|align=center|3rd "B"
|align=center|11
|align=center|22
|align=center|5
|align=center|2
|align=center|15
|align=center|21
|align=center|22
|align=center|17
|align=center|1/32 finals
|align=center|
|align=center|
|align=center bgcolor=pink|Withdrew
|}

References and Notes

External links
  History of football in Melitopol
  Fans website

 
Defunct football clubs in Ukraine
Football clubs in Zaporizhzhia Oblast
Sport in Melitopol
Association football clubs established in 1991
Association football clubs disestablished in 2011
1991 establishments in Ukraine
2011 disestablishments in Ukraine